The Green Line is the proposed second section of a light rail system the Tel Aviv metropolitan area, known as Tel Aviv Light Rail. The line will run from Rishon LeZion northwards through Holon through central Tel Aviv and will split into two branches: One to Herzliya in the north, and one to Ramat HaHayal neighborhood in Tel Aviv in the northeast. The expected annual passenger forecast is 65 million.

NTA is including the design and boring of the Green Line's tunnels as part of Red Line's tunnels overall contract so that work on the Green Line's underground portion can commence immediately following the completion of the Red Line tunnels.

References

External links
Green Line on NTA website
תת"ל 71 ב' - קו ירוק Detailed plans for the Green Line at the NTA website
NTA, English
NTA, Hebrew

Transport in Tel Aviv
Proposed railway lines in Israel
2024 in rail transport
Tel Aviv Light Rail